Tmesisternus elateroides is a species of beetle in the family Cerambycidae. It was described by Gestro in 1876. It is known from Papua New Guinea.

References

elateroides
Beetles described in 1876